Trichaetoides hosei is a moth in the family Erebidae. It was described by Walter Rothschild in 1910. It is found on Borneo. The habitat consists of montane areas, including lower montane forests.

References

Moths described in 1910
Syntomini